Fővárosi Testedzők Köre was a Hungarian football club from the town of Budapest.

History
Fővárosi Testedzők Köre debuted in the 1916-17 season of the Hungarian League and finished ninth.

Name Changes 
1909-1949: Fővárosi Testedzők Köre
1922: merger with Acél Torna Egylet
1926: foundation of a new club, Zuglói VII. Kerületi AC as Turul FC 
1949: merger with Magyar Acél SE

References

External links
 Profile

Football clubs in Hungary
1909 establishments in Hungary
Association football clubs established in 1909
Association football clubs disestablished in 1949
1949 disestablishments in Hungary